The 2009–10 Moldovan National Division season was FC Sheriff Tiraspol's 12th Moldovan National Division season, during which they retained the League and Cup titles. Sheriff were knocked out of the UEFA Champions League at the Third Qualifying round by Olympiacos, dropping into the UEFA Europa League, where they finished third in their group.

Squad

Out on loan

Transfer

In

Out

Loans in

Loans out

Competitions

National Division

Results summary

Results

Table

Moldovan Cup

UEFA Champions League

Qualifying stage

UEFA Europa League

Group stage

Squad statistics

Appearances and goals

|-
|colspan="14"|Players away from Sheriff on loan:

|-
|colspan="14"|Players who left Sheriff during the season:

|}

Goal scorers

Disciplinary record

Notes
Notes
Note 1: The second of two home matches which Steaua București had to play behind closed doors because their fans had flown offensive banners to Újpest in the second qualifying round.

References

Moldovan football clubs 2009–10 season
2009-10